Herpetogramma moderatalis is a moth in the family Crambidae. It was described by Hugo Theodor Christoph in 1881. It is found in Japan, Korea, the Russian Far East (Amur, Ussuri) and China.

The wingspan is 31–35 mm.

The larvae have been recorded feeding on Petasites japonica, living in a rolled leaf of their host plant.

References

Moths described in 1881
Herpetogramma
Moths of Asia